Edelbach is a small river of the district Aschaffenburg in the Bavarian part of the Spessart, Germany.

It is a left tributary of the Kahl. The Edelbach gave its name to the village of Edelbach in Kleinkahl. Up to the 20th century, both the river and the village bore the name Ölbach.

Course

The Edelbach springs in a forest at the foot of the back of the mountain Eselshöhe, below the mountain Edelberg , between its two northern foothills, Sommerberg  and Ölberg . The main source is located on the boundary to the unincorporated area Gemarkung Schöllkrippener Forst, below the hiking trail K2. The Ringgrund from there to the spring is a dry valley.

The Edelbach runs parallel to the Kreisstraße AB 20 to the north-west. Here it is strengthened by a larger spring at a forest house and the brook from the Kafloosquelle. In the village Edelbach, which is part of Kleinkahl, it is crossed by the Degen-Weg, a hiking trail, then takes up the water of other springs. In older times, it drove a sawmill there. North of the sawmill, opposite a 	Kneipp water-treading basin, it crosses the Kahltal-Spessart cycle path and flows into the Kahl.

History

At the spring of the Edelbach, in the late Middle Ages or in the early modern times, a now abandoned glass hut was situated. Its former location is now protected as a ground monument. Immediately to the east, there was the quarry from which the raw materials were extracted.

See also
List of rivers of Bavaria

Rivers of Bavaria
Rivers of the Spessart
Rivers of Germany